Ian James Mason is an Australian ornithologist and taxonomist who is Senior Collection Manager for the Australian National Wildlife Collection.  He is an authority on oology.

Publications
As well as writing numerous scientific papers, Mason has collaborated on several books about birds.
 1980 – Nocturnal Birds of Australia. (With Richard Schodde. Illustrations by Jeremy Boot). Lansdowne Editions: Melbourne. (Whitley Medal 1981).
 1997 – Zoological Catalogue of Australia: Aves (Columbidae to Coraciidae) v. 37. 2. (With Richard Schodde). CSIRO Publishing. 
 1998 – CSIRO List of Australian Vertebrates: A Reference with Conservation Status. (With Richard Schodde, M. Stanger, M Clayton, and J. Wombey). CSIRO Publishing. 
 1999 – The Directory of Australian Birds: Passerines. A taxonomic and zoogeographic atlas of the biodiversity of birds of Australia and its territories. (With Richard Schodde). CSIRO Publishing.

References

Australian ornithologists
Australian nature writers
Australian taxonomists
Year of birth missing (living people)
Living people
Collection managers
Egg collectors
Ornithological writers
20th-century Australian zoologists